Arthur Raymond Godar (January 8, 1924 – February 6, 2011) was an American politician and businessman.

Born in Milwaukee, Wisconsin, Godar served in the United States Army Air Forces during World War II. In 1947, he received his bachelor's degree in business from Marquette University. He owned a car dealership in Oconomowoc, Wisconsin. He served in the Wisconsin State Assembly in 1953 as a Republican. He moved to Florida in 1977 where he owned a motel, the Malaga, in Cape Coral, Florida and served on the Lee County, Florida planning commission.

Notes

1924 births
2011 deaths
American automobile salespeople
People from Cape Coral, Florida
Politicians from Milwaukee
Marquette University alumni
United States Army Air Forces soldiers
Military personnel from Milwaukee
Businesspeople from Florida
Businesspeople from Milwaukee
Republican Party members of the Wisconsin State Assembly
20th-century American businesspeople